Tralee Casement station (Tralee Railway Station) is the terminus station on the Mallow–Tralee line and serves the town of Tralee in County Kerry. It is the most westerly railway station in Europe.

Description

Superficially, Tralee station resembles Killarney railway station, with the main station buildings lying south of the main line, and a short overall roof covering part of the main platform and the run-round loop.  There is also a shorter bay platform serving the south face of the main platform, stopping short of the main building.  A platform canopy covers part of both platforms 1 and 2, east of the main building and overall roof.  Both platforms were considerably extended in 1979.

Until recently there was an active container terminal and freight yard opposite the main station.  This survives for permanent way trains and the storage of redundant equipment.  The yard opposite the passenger station was built in the late 1970s, on the site of the original freight yard and engine shed, to replace a larger yard alongside the former Tralee-Fenit and Tralee-Limerick line west of the passenger station.  The Tralee-Fenit line has been converted into a greenway which opened in 2022.  The rest of the site has been cleared and sold for redevelopment.

Services

Passengers transfer at Mallow for services to Dublin and Cork or via a small number of direct Dublin and Cork services.

Tralee is served by 7–8 trains each weekday.  There is a slightly reduced service on Sundays. There are 4 Dublin InterCity Trains on Sundays.

There are also connecting trains at Limerick Junction for Clonmel and Waterford as well as Limerick, Ennis, Athenry and Galway.

History
The station, originally named Tralee South, was opened on 18 July 1859.

A serious accident occurred at the station on 24 April 1901 at 6.20 am. The 2.30 am Mallow to Tralee mail goods train failed to stop, and ran into the buffer stops at a speed estimated at between 25 and 30 mph. The driver of the train and a guard who had been travelling on the footplate were killed instantly. The fireman died a few hours later.

On 10 April 1966, the station was given the name Casement in commemoration of Roger Casement, one of the executed leaders of the Easter Rising of 1916.

See also
 List of railway stations in Ireland

References

External links
Irish Rail Tralee (Casement) Station Website

1859 establishments in Ireland
Railway Station
Iarnród Éireann stations in County Kerry
Railway stations in County Kerry
Railway stations opened in 1859
Railway stations in the Republic of Ireland opened in the 19th century